Jessica Ann Collins (born March 8, 1983) is an American actress.

Early life
Collins was born in San Antonio, Bexar County, Texas.  She is one of four sisters, all of whom are involved in the arts. For much of her childhood, she and her family resided in rural Los Angeles, Texas. Collins attended Tom C. Clark High School in San Antonio, graduating in 2001. She attended Juilliard graduating in 2005.

Career
Collins has portrayed the roles of Natalie Davis, the psychopath serial killer The Miniature Killer, on CSI: Crime Scene Investigation and social worker Lizzie Miller on the ABC's The Nine. She portrayed Maggie Young on the AMC original series Rubicon.

Filmography

Theatre
 Manic Flight Reaction (2005) as Grace
King Lear (Shakespeare in the Park 2014) as Cordelia

References

External links

Jessica Collins: Biography, Latest News & Videos at TVGuide.com

1983 births
Living people
21st-century American women
Juilliard School alumni
Actresses from San Antonio
American film actresses
American television actresses